Sergio Rosas Castro (born 3 March 1984 in Puebla, Mexico) is a Mexican football midfielder who plays for Correcaminos UAT in the Liga de Ascenso.

He started his career with Puebla and made over 50 Primera appearances before moving to Tijuana.

He later played for Lobos BUAP, Correcaminos UAT and Irapuato.

References

1984 births
Living people
Mexican footballers
Club Puebla players
Club Tijuana footballers
Liga MX players
People from Puebla
Association football midfielders